Ekta Nagar railway station (station code: EKNR) earlier known as Kevadiya railway station (station code: KDCY) is located in Kevadiya, Narmada district, Gujarat, India. It consists of 3 platforms.

Location 
Facing the Narmada river, it is 7 kilometers away from the small town of Kevadiya. The construction of the station aims to make the Statue of Unity more accessible to tourists. Ekta Nagar railway station is located at a distance of just 5 kilometres from Statue of Unity.

Development 

The President of India, Ram Nath Kovind had laid the foundation stone on 15 December 2018. It is also India's first railway station with a Green Building Certificate.

The construction of the railway station is set to cost 200 million Indian rupees. The railway line will connect Kevadiya to Chandod, Moriya, Tilakwada and Garudeshwar. The existing Narrow Gauge railway line between Chandod and Dabhoi has been converted to broad gauge. Another  stretch is being laid between Chandod and Kevadiya.
The station building has three levels. The first two levels contain facilities for passengers and the third floor is an art gallery. It was inaugurated on 17 January 2021.

Trains
 12927/12928 Ekta Nagar - Dadar Superfast Express
 20903/20904 Ekta Nagar - Varanasi Mahamana Express
 20905/20906 Ekta Nagar - Rewa Mahamana Express
 20919/20920 Ekta Nagar - Chennai Central Superfast Express
 20945/20946 Ekta Nagar - Hazrat Nizamuddin Gujarat Sampark Kranti Express
 20947/20948 Ekta Nagar–Ahmedabad Jan Shatabdi Express
 20949/20950 Ekta Nagar–Ahmedabad Jan Shatabdi Express
 69201/69202 Ekta Nagar–Pratapnagar MEMU
 69203/69204 Ekta Nagar–Pratapnagar MEMU
 69205/69206 Ekta Nagar–Pratapnagar MEMU

See also
 Vadodara Junction railway station
 Dabhoi Junction railway station
 Pratapnagar railway station

References

External links

Railway stations in Narmada district